Silent Scream is the fifth album by the group Shooting Star. It was produced by Ron Nevison, though the band's guitarist, Van McLain, said in a 2003 interview with Classic Rock Revisited that the band had a falling out with Nevison and fired him in the middle of recording, with the album's recording engineer, Greg Ladanyi, stepping up to finish it. It is the last Shooting Star album to date to feature founding members Gary West and Charles Waltz (who didn't return to the band following its resurrection in 1989), and the last album to feature drummer Steve Thomas until 2006's Circles. It is also the only Shooting Star release to date not to feature bassist Ron Verlin and the band's only album to feature Norm Dahlor on bass.

Track listing

Personnel
Van McLain – guitars, lead vocals
Gary West – lead vocals, guitars, keyboards
Norm Dahlor – bass
Steve Thomas – drums
Charles Waltz – violin, keyboards, vocals

References

1985 albums
Shooting Star (band) albums